Kolik (also Romanized as Kolīk; also known as Gelīk-e Qadīm) is a village in Chaybasar-e Shomali Rural District, Bazargan District, Maku County, West Azerbaijan Province, Iran. At the 2006 census, its population was 165, in 23 families.

References 

Populated places in Maku County